The Ribble way is a long-distance walk between the Lancashire coast and the Yorkshire Dales National Park largely following the course of the River Ribble.

The route passes through a variety of landscapes including tidal marsh, open moorland and limestone gorges. It begins to the south of the Ribble estuary, the route then runs through Preston and on to the historic town of Clitheroe. Next it heads up into the Pennines to reach its source on remote Cam Fell.

History
The idea of opening a walk along the Ribble called the Ribble Way was first suggested back in 1967 at the inaugural meeting of the Preston and Fylde branch of the Ramblers' Association. The Guardian reported in 1972 that the Ramblers Association were planning Britain's first riverside long footpath called the Ribble Way. The idea eventually attracted official support and was opened in 1985. Grove head is actually the source of the Gayle Beck which feeds into the River Ribble near Ribblehead.

Route

The official start of the Ribble Way is the Dolphin Inn on Marsh Lane in Longton.

The Ribble Way connects with several other long-distance walks, including the Dales Way, the Pennine Way, the Pennine Bridleway and the Round Preston Walk.

Settlements

Longton
Preston
Frenchwood
Ribchester
Little Town
Winckley Hall
Clitheroe
Horrocksford
Paythorne
Rathmell
Giggleswick
Stainforth
Horton in Ribblesdale
Chapel-le-Dale

After which the route joins the Dales Way

References

Further reading 
 
 
 
 
 
 
 
 
 

Footpaths in Lancashire
Footpaths in North Yorkshire
Long-distance footpaths in England
Ribblesdale